Saint-Jean-d'Arves is a commune in the Savoie department in the Auvergne-Rhône-Alpes region in south-eastern France.

It is a ski resort, part of the larger Les Sybelles ski area.

See also
Communes of the Savoie department

References

External links

 Tourist office website

Communes of Savoie